James Ramsey Murray (1841–1905) was an American composer and author including of songbooks. His work includes hymns and Christmas music and was published by Root & Cady as well as S. Brainard Sons. His work includes a popular arrangement of "Away in a Manger". He helped write "Daisy Deane" in an American Civil War camp.

Murray helped produce the singing lesson book The Pacific Glee Book with Frederic Woodman Root. A portrait of him by Jacob Henry Hall is in the Library of Congress.

Murray was born to a Scottish family.

Murray died on 10 March 1905 in Cincinnati of Addison's disease and he was buried at Spring Grove Cemetery

Selected songs
"Gallop" with H.W. Fairbank, on the Copper: Original Soundtrack

Bibliography
Pure Diamonds (1872)
School chimes : a new school music book (1874)
Joyful Songs (1875)
Heavenward (1877)
Heart and voice : a new collection of Sunday school songs (1881)
Dainty songs for little lads and lasses : for use in the kindergarten, school and home (1887)

References

1841 births
1905 deaths
19th-century American composers
American people of Scottish descent
People from Andover, Massachusetts
Musicians from Massachusetts
Musicians from Cincinnati